The 2022–23 season is the 98th season in the existence of FC Emmen and the club's first season back in the top flight of Dutch football. In addition to the domestic league, Emmen are participating in this season's edition of the KNVB Cup.

Players

Pre-season and friendlies

Competitions

Overall record

Eredivisie

League table

Results summary

Results by round

Matches 
The league fixtures were announced on 17 June 2022.

KNVB Cup

References 

FC Emmen seasons
Emmen